The Fifth Amendment of the Constitution of India, officially known as The Constitution (Fifth Amendment) Act, 1955, empowered the President to prescribe a time limit for a State Legislature to convey its views on proposed Central laws relating to the formation of new States and alteration of areas, boundaries or names of existing States. The amendment also permitted the President to extend the prescribed limit, and prohibited any such bill from being introduced in Parliament until after the expiry of the prescribed or extended period. The 5th Amendment re-enacted the proviso to Article 3 of the Constitution.

Text
The full text of Article 3 of the Constitution, before the 5th Amendment is given below:

The full text of the 5th Amendment is given below:

Proposal and enactment
Under the proviso to Article 3 of the Constitution (relating to formation of new States and alteration of areas, boundaries or names of existing States), no bill for the purpose of forming a new state, increasing or decreasing the area of any state or altering the boundaries or name of any state could be introduced in Parliament, unless the views of the State Legislatures concerned with respect to the provisions of the bill had been ascertained by the President. It was considered desirable that when a reference was made to the State Legislatures for the said purpose, the President should be able to prescribe the period within which the states should convey their views, and it should be open to the President to extend such period whenever he considered it necessary. It was also considered desirable to provide that the bill would not be introduced until after the expiry of such period. The 5th Amendment sought to amend the proviso to Article 3 of the Constitution accordingly.

The original Article 3 was so drafted because of three main reasons; (a) When it was drafted, the Princely States had not been fully integrated, (b) There was also the possibility of reorganisation of states on linguistic basis; and (c) Constituent Assembly had foreseen that such reorganisation could not be postponed for long. Therefore, accordingly, Article 3 was incorporated in the Constitution providing for an easy and simple method for reorganisation of the states at any time.

The Constitution (Fifth Amendment) Bill, 1955 (Bill No. 60 of 1955) was introduced in the Lok Sabha on 21 November 1955. It was introduced by C.C. Biswas, then Minister of Law and Minority Affairs, and sought to amend Articles 3, 100, 101, 103, 148, 189, 190, 192, 276, 297, 311, 316 and 319 of the Constitution. However, the bill could not be taken up for consideration by the House and lapsed on the dissolution of the First Lok Sabha. The government decided to introduce a separate bill to expedite consideration and passing of the amendment to article 3, because it felt that the Constitution (Fifth Amendment) Bill would take a very long time to be disposed of, as it sought to amend several articles. In order to achieve this, the Constitution (Seventh Amendment) Bill, 1955 (Bill No. 63 of 1955) which sought to amend article 3, was introduced in the Lok Sabha on 28 November 1955, by C.C. Biswas. Clause 2 of this Bill, which sought to amend article 3, was exactly similar to the corresponding clause of the Constitution (Fifth Amendment) Bill, 1955. A motion to refer the Seventh Amendment Bill to the a Select Committee was moved on 30 November 1955. However, this motion failed to obtain the support of a special majority as required by the Rules of Procedure of the House.

The government then introduced the Constitution (Eighth Amendment) Bill, 1955 (Bill No. 73 of 1955), which sought to amend article 3. The new bill was introduced in the Lok Sabha on 9 December 1955, by H.V. Pataskar, then Minister of Legal Affairs, and sought to amend Article 3 of the Constitution. It was debated by the Lok Sabha on 12 and 13 December and passed in its original form on 13 December 1955. After being passed by the House, the Speaker substituted the bracket and words "(Eighth Amendment)" in clause I of the Bill by the brackets and words "(Fifth Amendment)", through a formal amendment. This Bill, as so changed, was considered and passed by the Rajya Sabha on 15 December 1955.

The Bill received assent from then President Rajendra Prasad on 24 December 1955, and was notified in The Gazette of India on 26 December 1955. The 5th Amendment came into force from 12 December 1956.

See also
List of amendments of the Constitution of India

References

05
1955 in India
1955 in law
Nehru administration